The Leilachspitze in the Allgäu Alps is a mountain, and the highest peak in the Vilsalpsee Mountains. It lies within the Austrian state of Tyrol.

Gallery

References

Literature 
 Kompass walking, cycling and ski touring map: Sheet 04 Tannheimer Tal (1:35,000).  (as at: February 2007)

External links 

 Tour report – detailed report with map, photographs and information on the mountaineering requirements

Two-thousanders of Austria
Mountains of the Alps
Mountains of Tyrol (state)
Allgäu Alps